Resurrecting the Past is a Big Finish Productions audio drama featuring Lisa Bowerman as Bernice Summerfield, a character from the spin-off media based on the long-running British science fiction television series Doctor Who.

Plot 
Braxiatel's plans seem to be coming to fruition. As Adrian and Peter search for a missing Bernice, Robyn and Bev must investigate to find why Benny has been so important to Braxiatel for so long...

Cast
Bernice Summerfield - Lisa Bowerman
Irving Braxiatel - Miles Richardson
Bev Tarrant - Louise Faulkner
Adrian Wall - Harry Myers
Joseph - Steven Wickham
Hass - Paul Wolfe
Doggles - Sam Stevens
Peter Summerfield - Thomas Grant
Robyn - Donna Berlin
Lianna - Rachel Lawrence
Allen - Alex Mallinson

External links
Professor Bernice Summerfield: Resurrecting the Past 

Resurrecting the Past
Fiction set in the 27th century